Francimar Barroso (born 29 February 1980) is a Brazilian mixed martial artist currently competing in the Heavyweight division. A professional competitor since 2004, he has also competed for the UFC, Shooto, and Professional Fighters League.

Mixed martial arts career

Brazilian circuit
On 12 April 2013, he faced Brazilian prospect Simao Melo da Silva for the WOCS Light Heavyweight Championship. Barroso won the fight via rear-naked choke. He vacated the title shortly after the fight, after getting called from the UFC to be a late-fight replacement.

Shooto Brazil
Towards the beginning of his career, Barroso competed at Shooto Brazil 11 on 28 March 2009, against Roque Oliver. He won by submission (rear-naked choke). Shortly after the fight he was signed to a four-fight contract. He fought at the next event as well, fighting Levi da Costa on 30 May 2009. He won the fight by doctor stoppage.

After a long hiatus, Barroso returned on 10 March 2012, when he faced Falco Neto Lopes at Shooto Brazil 28. Barroso won via guillotine choke. On 23 November 2012, Barroso fought for the vacant Shooto Brazil Light Heavyweight championship, as he faced number one contender Cristiano Souza. Barroso won the fight by doctor stoppage to win the championship. However he vacated the title, little over a year later to fight in the UFC.

Desert Force Championship
In November 2010, Barroso signed with upstart Jordan promotion Desert Force Championship (DFC). He made his DFC debut on 8 December 2010, against Abhijeet Petkar. Barroso won via head kick KO. Then on 19 May 2011, he faced Russian prospect Baga Agaev at DFC 2. He lost the fight when Agaev landed a blistering punch that knocked Barroso down, and then landed multiple knees before the referee stepped in to stop the fight.

Ultimate Fighting Championship
Barroso made his UFC debut on 3 August 2013, when he faced fellow Brazilian Ednaldo Oliveira, after Oliveira's original opponent Robert Drysdale was forced out of the bout due to injury. Barroso won via unanimous decision.

Barroso faced UFC newcomer Hans Stringer at UFC Fight Night 38 on 23 March 2014. He lost the back-and-forth fight via split decision.

Barroso was expected to face Patrick Cummins at UFC Fight Night: Henderson vs. Khabilov on 7 June 2014. However, Barroso was forced to pull out of the bout due to injury.

Barroso was expected to face Ovince St. Preux on 8 November 2014 at UFC Fight Night 56, replacing Rafael Cavalcante.  In turn, this fight was scrapped when St. Preux was tabbed as a replacement in the event headliner.

Barroso faced Ryan Jimmo on 30 May 2015 at UFC Fight Night 67. He won the fight by unanimous decision.

Barroso was expected to face promotional newcomer Abdul-Kerim Edilov on 17 January 2016 at UFC Fight Night 81. However, Edilov pulled out of the fight in the days leading up to the event citing a knee injury and was replaced by fellow newcomer Elvis Mutapčić. Barroso won the fight via unanimous decision.

Barroso faced Nikita Krylov on 8 May 2016 at UFC Fight Night 87. He lost the fight via submission in the second round.

Barroso was expected to face C. B. Dollaway on 10 September 2016 at UFC 203. On the day of the event, Dollaway suffered a back injury at his hotel due to a malfunctioning elevator and was unable to participate. As a result, Barroso was also removed from the event.

Barroso faced promotional newcomer Darren Stewart on 19 November 2016 at UFC Fight Night 100. He lost the bout via TKO in the first round, as he was dazed by an inadvertent headbutt which went unnoticed by the referee and preceded the TKO stoppage. Eventually the result was overturned to "No Contest" by the Comissão Atlética Brasileira de MMA (CABMMA).

A rematch with Stewart took place on 18 March 2017 at UFC Fight Night 107. Barroso won the fight by unanimous decision.

Barroso faced promotional newcomer Aleksandar Rakić on 2 September 2017 at UFC Fight Night 115. He lost the fight by unanimous decision.

Barroso faced Gian Villante on 20 January 2018 at UFC 220. He lost via split decision .

Personal life 
In 2016 he proposed to his girlfriend Milenna Tonnera with whom he lived together for more than two years at the moment just after the fight. Barroso has a son and a daughter.

In 2021 he married Anastasia Motyashova and moved to Moscow.

Championships and accomplishments
WOCS
WOCS Light Heavyweight Champion (One time; vacated)
Shooto Brazil
Shooto Brazil Light Heavyweight Championship (One time; vacated)

Mixed martial arts record

|-
|Win
|align=center|25–7–1 (1)
|Alex Nicholson
|Decision (unanimous)
|PFL 9
|
|align=center| 2
|align=center| 5:00
|Las Vegas, Nevada, United States
|
|-
|Win
|align=center|24–7–1 (1)
|Ben Edwards
|Decision (unanimous)
|PFL 6
|
|align=center| 3
|align=center| 5:00
|Atlantic City, New Jersey, United States
|
|-
|Win
|align=center|23–7–1 (1)
|Alex Nicholson
|Decision (unanimous)
|PFL 3
|
|align=center| 3
|align=center| 5:00
|Uniondale, New York, United States
|
|-
|Win
|align=center|22–7–1 (1)
|Mikhail Mokhnatkin
|Decision (unanimous)
|RCC 5
|
|align=center|3
|align=center|5:00
|Ekaterinburg, Russia
| 
|-
|Draw
|align=center| 21–7–1 (1)
|Josh Copeland
|Draw (unanimous) 
|PFL 8
|
|align=center|2
|align=center|5:00
|New Orleans, Louisiana, United States
|
|- 
|Win
|align=center|21–7 (1)
|Jack May
|Submission (arm-triangle choke)
|PFL 4
|
|align=center| 1
|align=center| 1:36
|Uniondale, New York, United States 
| 
|-
|Win
|align=center|20–7 (1)
|Daniel Gallemore
|TKO (doctor stoppage)
|PFL 1
|
|align=center|1
|align=center|3:57
|New York, New York, United States
|Return to Heavyweight.
|-
|Loss
|align=center|19–7 (1)
|Gian Villante
|Decision (split)
|UFC 220 
|
|align=center|3
|align=center|5:00
|Boston, Massachusetts, United States
|
|-
|Loss
|align=center|19–6 (1)
|Aleksandar Rakić
|Decision (unanimous)
|UFC Fight Night: Volkov vs. Struve
| 
|align=center|3
|align=center|5:00
|Rotterdam, Netherlands
|
|-
|Win
|align=center|19–5 (1)
|Darren Stewart
|Decision (unanimous)
|UFC Fight Night: Manuwa vs. Anderson
|
|align=center|3
|align=center|5:00
|London, England
| 
|-
|NC
|align=center|18–5 (1)
|Darren Stewart
|NC (inadvertent headbutt)
|UFC Fight Night: Bader vs. Nogueira 2
|
|align=center|1
|align=center|1:34
|São Paulo, Brazil
|
|-
|Loss
|align=center|18–5
|Nikita Krylov
|Submission (rear-naked choke)
|UFC Fight Night: Overeem vs. Arlovski
|
|align=center|2
|align=center|3:11
|Rotterdam, Netherlands
|
|-
|Win
|align=center|18–4
|Elvis Mutapčić
|Decision (unanimous)
|UFC Fight Night: Dillashaw vs. Cruz
|
|align=center|3
|align=center|5:00
|Boston, Massachusetts, United States
|
|-
|Win
|align=center|17–4
|Ryan Jimmo
|Decision (unanimous)
|UFC Fight Night: Condit vs. Alves
|
|align=center|3
|align=center|5:00
|Goiânia, Brazil
|
|-
|Loss
|align=center|16–4
|Hans Stringer
|Decision (split)
|UFC Fight Night: Shogun vs. Henderson 2
| 
|align=center|3
|align=center|5:00
|Natal, Brazil
|
|-
| Win
|align=center|16–3
| Ednaldo Oliveira
|Decision (unanimous)
| UFC 163
| 
|align=center| 3
|align=center| 5:00
|Rio de Janeiro, Brazil
|
|-
| Win
|align=center| 15–3
| Simao Melo 
|Submission (rear-naked choke)
|WOCS: Watch Out Combat Show 25
| 
|align=center|2
|align=center|4:56
|Rio de Janeiro, Brazil
|
|-
| Win
|align=center| 14–3
| Cristiano Souza
|TKO (doctor stoppage)
|Shooto: Brazil 36
| 
|align=center|1
|align=center|N/A
|Brasília, Brazil
|
|-
| Win
|align=center| 13–3
| Falco Lopes
|Submission (guillotine choke)
|Shooto: Brazil 28
| 
|align=center|1
|align=center|3:15
|Rio de Janeiro, Brazil
|
|-
| Loss
|align=center| 12–3
| Baga Agaev
|KO (punch and knees)
|DFC: Desert Force 2
| 
|align=center|1
|align=center|1:13
|Amman, Jordan
|
|-
| Win
|align=center| 12–2
| Abhijeet Petkar
|KO (head kick)
|DFC: Desert Force 1
| 
|align=center|1
|align=center|0:05
|Amman, Jordan
|
|-
| Win
|align=center| 11–2
| Kleber Raimundo 
|Decision (unanimous)
|CF: Capital Fight 3
| 
|align=center|3
|align=center|5:00
|Brasília, Brazil
|
|-
| Win
|align=center| 10–2
| Jacob Quintana
|TKO (submission to punches)
|MK: Mega Kombat
| 
|align=center|3
|align=center|N/A
|Minas Gerais, Brazil
|
|-
| Win
|align=center| 9–2
| Alessandro Stefano
|TKO (punches)
|BC: Bitetti Combat 5
| 
|align=center|1
|align=center|1:50
|São Paulo, Brazil
|
|-
| Win
|align=center| 8–2
| Paulo Henrique Garcia 
|TKO (punches)
|IMC: Iron Man Championship 3
| 
|align=center|1
|align=center|N/A
|Belém, Brazil
|
|-
| Win
|align=center| 7–2
| Levi da Costa
|TKO (corner stoppage)
|Shooto: Brazil 12
| 
|align=center|1
|align=center|5:00
|Rio de Janeiro, Brazil
|
|-
| Win
|align=center| 6–2
| Roque Oliver
|Submission (rear-naked choke)
|Shooto: Brazil 11
| 
|align=center|1
|align=center|4:48
|Rio de Janeiro, Brazil
|
|-
| Win
|align=center| 5–2
| Joao Paulo de Souza
|TKO (punches)
|CC: Coari Combat 3
| 
|align=center|1
|align=center|N/A
|Amazonas, Brazil
|
|-
| Win
|align=center| 4–2
| Adriano Balby
|Submission (rear-naked choke)
|MFC: Manaus Fight Championship
| 
|align=center|1
|align=center|0:52
|Manaus, Brazil
|
|-
| Loss
|align=center| 3–2
| Geronimo dos Santos
|TKO (punches)
|AC: Amazon Challenge 2
| 
|align=center|1
|align=center|4:00
|Manaus, Brazil
|
|-
| Win
|align=center| 3–1
| Sandro Pitbull
|TKO (finger injury)
|HTJ: Hero's the Jungle
| 
|align=center|2
|align=center|N/A
|Manaus, Brazil
|
|-
| Loss
|align=center| 2–1
| Josue Makowiecky 
|KO (knee)
|FF: Floripa Fight 1
| 
|align=center|1
|align=center|2:27
|Florianópolis, Brazil
|
|-
| Win
|align=center| 2–0
| Rogerio Farias
|TKO (submission to punches)
|FCC: Fight Center Cup 4
| 
|align=center|1
|align=center|N/A
|Rio Grande do Sul, Brazil
|
|-
| Win
|align=center| 1–0
| Junior Tigre
|KO (head kick)
|SFC: Slap Fight Combat
| 
|align=center|1
|align=center|4:27
|Fortaleza, Brazil
|

See also
 List of male mixed martial artists

References

External links
 
 
 

1980 births
Living people
Brazilian male mixed martial artists
Mixed martial artists utilizing Brazilian jiu-jitsu
Mixed martial artists utilizing kickboxing
Brazilian practitioners of Brazilian jiu-jitsu
People awarded a black belt in Brazilian jiu-jitsu
Sportspeople from Acre (state)
Ultimate Fighting Championship male fighters